Oreodera quinquetuberculata is a species of beetle in the family Cerambycidae. It was described by Drapiez in 1820.

References

Oreodera
Beetles described in 1820